The Brooks River Historic Ranger Station is a log structure located at Brooks Camp in Katmai National Park and Preserve, located on the Alaska Peninsula of southwestern Alaska.  It is a single-story building, made out of peeled logs felled in 1954 and assembled in 1955.  The building was the first structure built by the National Park Service in Katmai National Park.  It was built in part to oversee the growing Brooks Camp facility, which had been built over time by tourism concessionaires.

The building was listed on the National Register of Historic Places in 2010.

See also
National Register of Historic Places listings in Lake and Peninsula Borough, Alaska
National Register of Historic Places listings in Katmai National Park and Preserve

References

1955 establishments in Alaska
Government buildings completed in 1955
Log cabins in the United States
Park buildings and structures on the National Register of Historic Places in Alaska
Ranger stations in the United States
Buildings and structures on the National Register of Historic Places in Lake and Peninsula Borough, Alaska
Log buildings and structures on the National Register of Historic Places in Alaska
National Register of Historic Places in Katmai National Park and Preserve